The Kansas City Missouri Temple is the 137th operating temple of the Church of Jesus Christ of Latter-day Saints (LDS Church).  It is the first to be built in the Greater Kansas City area. Previous attempts at building a temple in the area failed in Independence in 1833 and Far West in 1838, after church founder Joseph Smith had selected and dedicated locations for their construction. A temple was completed in Independence in 1994 by the Community of Christ, which is not affiliated with The Church of Jesus Christ of Latter-day Saints.

History
The announcement of the new temple was made on October 4, 2008, during the church's 178th Semiannual general conference by LDS Church president Thomas S. Monson. When the announcement was made, Monson did not specify whether the temple would be constructed in Kansas or Missouri. However, a later press release confirmed that the temple would be built in the Shoal Creek development in Clay County, Missouri, within the city boundaries of Kansas City. This was the second temple of the LDS Church built in Missouri, after the St. Louis Missouri Temple.

The Kansas City Missouri Temple was announced concurrently with the Philadelphia Pennsylvania, Calgary Alberta, Córdoba Argentina and Rome Italy temples.

On October 22, 2009, the Kansas City Council approved The Meadows at Searcy Creek First Plat, the subdivision of the Shoal Creek development where the temple is located.  The plat includes the lot for a church meetinghouse as well as the temple. In 2019, JE Dunn Construction was selected to build a temple. Site work in the development, including acquiring property for the future temple, commenced in late October.  The official groundbreaking for the temple took place on May 8, 2010; attendance was by invitation only.

The temple stands not far from Liberty, Missouri where LDS Church founder Joseph Smith Jr. was incarcerated in the winter of 1838-39.

The temple was opened to the public for an open house between April 7–28, 2012. Among the visitors were Missouri governor Jay Nixon and Kansas governor Sam Brownback, who were given a private tour on April 5, 2012. Both governors presented proclamations to the LDS Church congratulating them on the completion of the temple. Over 92,000 people toured the temple. People from 47 states and 11 countries attended the open house.

On May 5, 2012, church members between the ages of 12 and 18 who resided in the new temple district staged a cultural performance at the Kansas City Municipal Auditorium in celebration of the completion of the temple. The following day, May 6, 2012, the temple was dedicated by Thomas S. Monson. The temple, built on 8 acres, serves 45,000 LDS Church members from 126 congregations in Kansas and Missouri, as well as some who live in Oklahoma and Arkansas.

Gallery

See also

 Comparison of temples of The Church of Jesus Christ of Latter-day Saints
 List of temples of The Church of Jesus Christ of Latter-day Saints
 List of temples of The Church of Jesus Christ of Latter-day Saints by geographic region
 Temple architecture (Latter-day Saints)
 The Church of Jesus Christ of Latter-day Saints in Missouri
 The Church of Jesus Christ of Latter-day Saints in Kansas

References

External links
 
Kansas City Missouri Temple Official site
Kansas City Missouri Temple at ChurchofJesusChristTemples.org

21st-century Latter Day Saint temples
Buildings and structures in Kansas City, Missouri
Temples (LDS Church) in the United States
The Church of Jesus Christ of Latter-day Saints in Missouri
2012 establishments in Missouri
Religious buildings and structures completed in 2012